Ella in Hamburg is a 1965 (see 1965 in music) live album by the American jazz singer Ella Fitzgerald, recorded in Hamburg, Germany.

Ella is accompanied by a trio led by the pianist Tommy Flanagan.
This was Ella's last live solo album to be released on the Verve label, and provides a perfect snapshot of her concert repertoire and voice at this stage of her career.

On September 18, 2007 the album was released on CD worldwide, on the Verve Record "Originals" reissues.

Track listing
For the 1965 Verve LP release; Verve V6-4069; Re-issued in 2007 on CD, Verve 06025 173 522-2

Side One:
 "Walk Right In" (Gus Cannon, Hosea Woods) – 3:43
 "That Old Black Magic" (Harold Arlen, Johnny Mercer) – 4:20
 "Body and Soul" (Frank Eyton, Johnny Green, Edward Heyman, Robert Sour) – 4:46
 "Here's That Rainy Day" (Sonny Burke, Jimmy Van Heusen) – 3:41
 "And the Angels Sing" (Ziggy Elman, Mercer) – 4:00
 "A Hard Day's Night" (John Lennon, Paul McCartney) – 3:21
Side Two:
 Ellington Medley: "Do Nothin' Till You Hear from Me"/"Mood Indigo"/"It Don't Mean A Thing (If It Ain't Got That Swing)" (Barney Bigard, Duke Ellington, Irving Mills, Bob Russell) – 6:38
 "The Boy from Ipanema" (Antonio Carlos Jobim, Norman Gimbel, Vinícius de Moraes) – 3:04
 "Don't Rain on My Parade" (Bob Merrill, Jule Styne) – 3:19
 "Angel Eyes" (Earl Brent, Matt Dennis) – 3:39
 "Smooth Sailing" (Arnett Cobb) – 4:07
 "Old MacDonald Had a Farm" (Traditional) – 3:51

Personnel
Recorded March 26, 1965, in Hamburg, Germany:
 Ella Fitzgerald - Vocals
 Tommy Flanagan Trio:
 Tommy Flanagan - Piano
 Keter Betts - Bass
 Gus Johnson - Drums

References

Albums produced by Norman Granz
Ella Fitzgerald live albums
1965 live albums
Verve Records live albums